Davide Galimberti (born 19 April 1976) is an Italian politician.

He is a member of the Democratic Party and was elected Mayor of Varese at the 2016 Italian local elections. He took office on 21 June 2016.

See also
2016 Italian local elections
List of mayors of Varese

References

External links
 

1976 births
Living people
Mayors of Varese
People from Varese
Democratic Party (Italy) politicians